"My House" is a song by American rapper Flo Rida from his 2015 EP of the same name. The song was released as the album's third official single on September 24, 2015, in the US. The song samples the drum break from "Impeach the President" by The Honey Drippers.

Commercial performance
"My House" debuted at number 96 on the Billboard Hot 100 in the issue dated November 28, 2015, before falling to 99 on the following week. The song then slowly gained momentum until a sharp increase in attention following Flo Rida's January 14, 2016 performance on The Tonight Show Starring Jimmy Fallon, a halftime performance at an NFL playoff game on January 16, and its appearance as WrestleMania 32's theme song on April 3, jumping places from 23 to 12 and becoming the track to gain the most digital sales in a week on the chart.

Steep rises in performance continued as the song once again jumped to number five the following week with the issue dated February 9, 2016, becoming Flo Rida's eleventh and last top 10 single in his native United States. The song has been certified quadruple Platinum in the US. The song sold 2,217,000 copies in the United States in 2016, making it the second best-selling song of the year, as well as the best-selling song of the first half of 2016. It was ranked at number 35 on Billboards Decade-End Digital Songs chart. As of December 2016, it has sold a total of 2,732,000 downloads in the country.

Music video
The music video was directed by Alex Acosta and features Flo Rida at a party full of women.

Use in media
"My House" was used as one of the official theme songs of the WWE professional wrestling event WrestleMania 32. Flo Rida performed a Nickelodeon-themed version of the song as part of the network's promotion of Super Bowl 50. It was also used in commercials for Northwestern Mutual financial services, Comcast Xfinity, and for Walmart. This song is also heard at the beginning of the 2017 film The House, which was released on June 30, 2017. The song is also heard in the trailer for the 2017 animated movie The Boss Baby and also 2 trailers for the 2016 film Middle School: The Worst Years of My Life.

Charts

Weekly charts

Year-end charts

Certifications

The Scott Brothers version

The Scott Brothers released a cover of the song with Eric Paslay on January 12, 2017.  The music video was filmed at their home in Las Vegas, Nevada.  The proceeds from the sale of the single go to St. Jude Children's Research Hospital.

While singing along to the original in while driving, Jonathan Scott thought it would make a good country song.  Paslay was originally brought on to do a rap cameo, but they liked his voice so much they invited him to sing on the entire song.

References

2015 singles
2014 songs
Atlantic Records singles
Eric Paslay songs
Flo Rida songs
Songs written by Flo Rida
Songs written by Ross Golan
Songs written by Johan Carlsson (musician)
Pop-rap songs